The PowerBook 3400c is a laptop computer in the PowerBook line manufactured by Apple Computer from February to November 1997. It was briefly the fastest laptop in the world. Using the PowerPC 603e processor running at speeds of up to 240 MHz, this PowerBook was the first to feature a PCI architecture, EDO memory, and a 64-bit wide, 40 MHz internal bus. It was also the first PowerBook to feature a PC card slot capable of being used as a zoomed video port. Like all Apple laptops since the PowerBook 500 series, it featured a built-in trackpad as the pointing device.

Specifications
The PowerBook 3400c series was issued in three different models, distinguished primarily by their processor speed. The base model ran at 180 MHz, and the two higher end models ran at 200 MHz and 240 MHz. Thus, the different models were referred to as the 3400c/180, 3400c/200, and 3400c/240. The 3400c/180 model was usually sold with only a built-in modem and a floppy drive; all 3400c/200 and 3400c/240 machines came with a built-in modem/Ethernet combination port and hot-swappable 1.4 MB floppy disk and CD drives. The only other difference between them was the capacity of the hard drive, ranging from 1.3 to 3.0 GB depending on the model.

Names
Prior to the PowerBook 3400c series, the names of PowerBooks reflected (among other things) the type of screen they had installed. For example, the PowerBook 1400cs had a passive matrix screen, and the 1400c an active matrix screen. Because all PowerBook 3400c computers came with the same 16-bit color, active matrix screen, the "c" designation at the end of the PowerBook 3400c name was somewhat superfluous, and is often dropped, even by Apple itself, for example in the user's manual. The internal code name used for the PowerBook 3400c during development was "Hooper", named so after the dog of one of the product design engineers.

Industrial design
In terms of industrial design the PowerBook 3400c owed much to the earlier PowerBook 5300 series. There were some key changes made, however, including the larger LCD screen; a wider removable drive bay allowing the use of CD readers; and a curved display housing that allowed for the inclusion of a second set of loudspeakers.

The first generation of G3 PowerBooks retained the same external appearance as the PowerBook 3400c.

CardBus compatibility
Like the PowerBook 5300 series, the 3400s came with a pair of PC card slots, but whereas those on the 5300s were strictly 16-bit device compatible, those on the 3400s were, at least in theory, compatible with 32-bit CardBus cards being based around the 32-bit Texas Instruments PCI1130 PC card controller. In reality, the PC card slots were designed to physically accept only 16-bit cards, though many users have managed to get a variety of CardBus cards to work with them. Using CardBus cards allows 3400 Series PowerBooks to be used with, for example, USB devices like printers and FireWire devices such as iPods.

Models

Timeline

References

External links
Low End Mac: PowerBook 3400c
 Classic Macs at MyMac.com: PowerBook 3400 
Apple Technical Specifications: PowerBook
3400c/180
3400c/200
3400c/240
PowerBook 3400c Digital Picture Frame

3400c
PowerPC Macintosh computers